Procambarus attiguus, known as the Silver Glen Springs cave crayfish, is a species of crayfish in the family Cambaridae. It is endemic to Silver Glen Springs, Marion County, Florida, and is listed as critically endangered on the IUCN Red List.

References

Cambaridae
Cave crayfish
Endemic fauna of Florida
Freshwater crustaceans of North America
Taxonomy articles created by Polbot
Crustaceans described in 1992
Taxa named by Horton H. Hobbs Jr.